Mchenga inornata is a species of fish in the family Cichlidae. It is endemic to Lake Malawi in Malawi. Its natural habitat is freshwater lakes.

References

inornata
Fish of Malawi
Fish of Lake Malawi
Fish described in 1908
Taxonomy articles created by Polbot